The 1892 Brown Bears football team represented Brown University as an independent in the 1892 college football season. Led by Charles P. Howland in his first and only season as head coach, Brown compiled a record of 4–4–2.

Schedule

References

Brown
Brown Bears football seasons
Brown Bears football